National Highway 703 (NH 703) is a National Highway in Northern India. National Highway 703 starts at the junction of NH 3 at Jalandar and traverses down to Sirsa to meet NH 9.

Route
Punjab
Jalandhar, Nakodar, Shahkot, Moga, Badhni, Barnala, Handiaya, Mansa, Jhunir, Sardulgarh - Haryana border.

Haryana

Punjab border - Sirsa.

Junctions

  Terminal near Jalandhar.
  near Jalandhar.
  and
  near Moga
  near Barnala.
  near Mansa.
  Terminal near Sirsa.

See also
 List of National Highways in India (by Highway Number)
 List of National Highways in India
 National Highways Development Project

References

External links
Driving Directions, Route map of National Highway 703
NH network map of India
 Map of NH 703

National highways in India
703
National Highways in Haryana
Transport in Jalandhar